Nikolay Ivanovich Matyukhin (born December 13, 1968 in Zhukovsky) is a Russian race walker. He is married to the sprinter Tatyana Chebykina.

International competitions

References

1968 births
Living people
People from Zhukovsky, Moscow Oblast
Sportspeople from Moscow Oblast
Russian male racewalkers
Olympic male racewalkers
Olympic athletes of Russia
Athletes (track and field) at the 1996 Summer Olympics
Athletes (track and field) at the 2000 Summer Olympics
World Athletics Championships athletes for Russia
World Athletics Championships medalists
Russian Athletics Championships winners